Dimitrios Andrikopoulos-Boukaouris (1867–1948) was a Greek politician of Achaea and a mayor of Patras.

He was born in Patras.  His mother came from a historic political family and so he kept her name 'Boukaouris' in his own surname.  He studied law and taught with politicals as a judge.

He was first elected as mayor in 1914 in the first elections which happened with the voting system, he remained mayor until 1925, he did not run from August 1 until . He brought electricity to the city and knew the municipal uses while World War I eased the factory works and closed the municipal electric and manufacturing factories.  In the continuation of electricity, it brought the same industrialists from their rights on electric power which had in their factory. It brought the exploitation of the Glafkos river in 1922 and finished in 1925 with many obstacles in many political changes. The main proposal happened and was accepted by Eleftherios Venizelos, later by Dimitrios Gounaris and finally Andreas Michalakopoulos, which concluded new fundings and the agreement which made the construction of the product and sojourn of electric power.  In the auctions counciled a Greek and twelve foreign companies. The hiring which made by the raising of the Insanity Refuge.

He died in Patras in 1948.

References

''The first version of the article is translated from and is based on the article at the Greek Wikipedia (el:Main Page)

1867 births
1948 deaths
Mayors of Patras
Politicians from Patras